Two Brothers (German:Zwei Brüder) is a 1929 German silent film directed by Mikhail Dubson and starring Hilde Jennings, Maria Forescu and Carl Auen.

The film's sets were designed by the art director August Rinaldi.

Cast
 Hilde Jennings as Evelyne  
 Maria Forescu as Ihre Mutter  
 Carl Auen as Eduard  
 John Mylong as Michael, der Bruder  
 Paul Rehkopf as Der Wirt  
 Gerhard Dammann as Ein Kavalier  
 Inge Jentschura as seine Freundin

References

Bibliography
 Bock, Hans-Michael & Bergfelder, Tim. The Concise CineGraph. Encyclopedia of German Cinema. Berghahn Books, 2009.

External links

1929 films
Films of the Weimar Republic
Films directed by Mikhail Dubson
German silent feature films
German black-and-white films